Te Manihera Poutama (? – 12 March 1847) was a New Zealand mission teacher and Anglican missionary. Of Māori descent, he identified with the Ngāti Ruanui iwi. He was born in Taranaki, New Zealand.

References

Year of birth missing
1847 deaths
New Zealand schoolteachers
New Zealand Anglican missionaries
Ngāti Ruanui people
New Zealand Māori religious leaders
Anglican missionaries in New Zealand